The French Law of 20 May 1802 was passed by Napoleon Bonaparte that day (30 floréal year X), revoking the Law of 4 February 1794 (16 pluviôse) which had abolished slavery in all the French colonies. However, the 1794 decree was only implemented in Saint-Domingue, Guadeloupe and Guiana, did not take effect in Mauritius, Reunion and Martinique, the last of which had been captured by the British and thus was unaffected by French law.

The colonial administration on Réunion had hindered the implementation of the 1794 law, while the one on Martinique refused to ratify it due to a royalist insurrection there, similar to that in the Vendée, which had been in revolt since 16 September 1793 and had, represented by planter Louis-François Dubuc, signed the Whitehall accord with the British government. On 6 February 1794, the British began their capture of Martinique and established full control over the island on 21 March 1794, and thus the territory remained unaffected by the 1794 decree.

The Law of 20 May 1802 explicitly concerned the territories which were not affected by the abolitionist law of 4 February 1794: it was linked to the Treaty of Amiens of 26 March 1802, which returned Martinique, Tobago and Saint Lucia to France. Consequently, it did not apply to Guadeloupe, Guyana or Santo Domingo . The reestablishment of slavery in Guadeloupe, first imposed militarily and illegally by General Richepanse, was formalized by another legislative measure, the consular decree of 16 July 1802 (27 Messidor year X). That document charged Denis Decrès, then Minister of the Navy and the Colonies, to restore slavery in Guadeloupe.

In French Guiana, slavery was restored by a consular decree from 7 December, followed by a local decree by Victor Hugues of 24 April 1803.

The Law of 20 May 1802 had no effect in Saint-Domingue where slavery had been abolished by the local proclamations of Sonthonax and Polverel since 1793.

Napoleon's attempts to restore French control of Saint-Domingue proved futile. This law united opposition to Napoleon's brother-in-law, 1802 general Leclerc (commander of the Saint-Domingue expedition), who failed in his attempts to restore French control of Saint-Domingue.

Notes

Abolitionism in France
1802 in law
First French Empire
1802 in France
Law of France
Haitian Revolution
Slavery legislation
May 1802 events